David Whittaker may refer to:

David Whittaker (cricketer) (1857–1901), English cricketer
David Whittaker (video game composer) (born 1957), British video game composer
David A. Whittaker (born 1952), American sound editor

See also
David Whitaker